Robert "Bob" Martin Horn (November 3, 1931 – January 11, 2019) was an American water polo player who competed in the 1956 Summer Olympics and the 1960 Summer Olympics. He was born in Minneapolis.

Horn went to Fullerton College and then California State University, Long Beach playing water polo at the later location. Horn was a member of the American water polo team which finished fifth in the 1956 tournament. He played five matches as goalkeeper. Four year later he finished seventh with the American team in the 1960 tournament. He played four matches as goalkeeper. For 28 years, Horn was the water polo coach at UCLA.

In 1977, he was inducted into the USA Water Polo Hall of Fame.

See also
 List of men's Olympic water polo tournament goalkeepers

References

External links
 

1931 births
2019 deaths
American male water polo players
Water polo goalkeepers
Olympic water polo players of the United States
Water polo players at the 1956 Summer Olympics
Water polo players at the 1960 Summer Olympics
Long Beach State Beach men's water polo players
UCLA Bruins men's water polo coaches
American water polo coaches